Every Man's Wife is a 1925 American drama film directed by Maurice Elvey, and written by Lillie Hayward. The film stars Elaine Hammerstein, Herbert Rawlinson, Robert Cain, Diana Miller and Dorothy Phillips. The film was released on June 7, 1925, by Fox Film Corporation.

Cast           
Elaine Hammerstein as Mrs. Randolph
Herbert Rawlinson as Mr. Randolph
Robert Cain as Mr. Bradin
Diana Miller as Emily
Dorothy Phillips as Mrs. Bradin

References

External links

1925 films
1920s English-language films
Silent American drama films
1925 drama films
Fox Film films
Films directed by Maurice Elvey
American silent feature films
American black-and-white films
1920s American films